Devorah Major is an American writer, editor, recording artist, and professor.  She has won awards in poetry, fiction, and creative non-fiction and is San Francisco's third Poet Laureate.

Biography
Major graduated from San Francisco State University in 1976 after studying African-American Studies and Health Education. She is now a part-time senior adjunct professor at the California College of the Arts.

Major has toured Africa, the Caribbean, South America, Europe, and all over the United States performing her poetry and speaking on panels focused on African-American poetry, Beat poetry, and poetry of resistance. She is the author of two novels and four books of poetry. Her fifth book of poetry, and then we became was published (in 2016) by City Lights.

Bibliography
 An Open Weave.  Seal Press. 1995. 
 Street Smarts.  Curbstone Books. 1996.  
 Browned Glass Windows.  Curbstone Books. 2002. 
 Where River Meets Ocean.  City Lights Books. 2003. 
 With More Than Tongue.  Creative Arts Book Company. 2003. 
 The Other Side of the Postcard.  City Lights Publishers. 2005. 
 and then we became.  City Lights Publishers. 2016.

References

External links
 Devvorah Majors home site
 Major at City Lights
 Major at CCA
 Major at Good Reads

Living people
1950s births
People from San Francisco
20th-century American poets
21st-century American poets
American women poets
Writers from San Francisco
San Francisco State University alumni
20th-century American women writers
21st-century American women writers
Poets Laureate of San Francisco